World Maths Day (World Math Day in American English) is an online international mathematics competition, powered by Mathletics (a learning platform from 3P Learning, the same organisation behind Reading Eggs and Mathseeds). Smaller elements of the wider Mathletics program effectively power the World Maths Day event.

The first World Maths Day started in 2007. Despite these origins, the phrases "World Maths Day" and "World Math Day" are trademarks, and not to be confused with other competitions such as the International Mathematical Olympiad or days such as Pi Day. In 2010, World Maths Day created a Guinness World Record for the Largest Online Maths Competition.

The next World Maths Day will take place on the 8th of March 2023.

Overview
Open to all school-aged students (4 to 18 years old), World Maths Day involves participants playing 20 × 60-second games, with the platform heavily based on "Live Mathletics" found in Mathletics. The contests involve mental maths problems appropriate for each age group, which test the accuracy and speed of the students as they compete against other students across the globe.

The simple but innovative idea of combining the aspects of multi-player online gaming with maths problems has contributed to its popularity around the world. There will be 10 Year group divisions for students to compete in from Kindergarten to Year 9 and above.

An online Hall of Fame will track points throughout the competition with prizes to be awarded to the top students and schools. The Champions Challenge is a new addition to the 2021 competition. Top Year/Grade 9 and above World Maths Day student come together to compete in a knockout tournament. As part of the challenge, students will have their event live streamed, bringing mathematics and Esports together.

History
The inaugural World Maths Day was held on March 13, 2007. 287,000 students from 98 countries answered 38,904,275 questions. The student numbers and the participating countries have steadily increased in the following years.

In 2009, 1.9 million students took part in World Maths Day.

In 2011, World Maths Day sets a Guinness World Record for the Largest Online Maths Competition, with almost 500 million maths questions answered during the event.

In 2012, 3P Learning launched the World Education Games. Over 5.9 Million students from 240 Countries and Territories around the world registered to take part, with World Maths Day being the biggest attraction. In 2013, it was held between 5–7 March and the awards were presented at the Sydney Opera House to the Champions.

In 2015, there were participants from 150 countries. US, UK and Australia all had over 1 million registrations.

The 2019 World Maths Day event was combined with a social media competition, where students around the world were encouraged to dress up in a maths-themed outfit to celebrate maths. Entries included famous mathematicians, an aerial shot of students forming a pi symbol, and human calculators.

In 2022, World Maths Day celebrates 15 years in the making.

Awards
A number of awards are offered to the students who take part and for those who do well in the event. Additionally the champions and the top ten students in the world are awarded gold medals every year.

There are also a number of national lead-up events in different regions around the world which are also based on the Mathletics format.

Champions
The individual gold medal winners through the years are listed below:

2007 Results

2008 Results

2009 Results

2010 Results

2011 Results

2012 Results

2013 Results

2015 Event

The 2015 event was held on October 13-October 15, 2015. There were 10 ages categories: 1 each for grades K-8, and one for grades 9+. The game limit was dropped to 20 games per student. It is possible to play further, but these do not count to ones personal total, only the event total. 169 Million points were scored across Maths, Literacy and Science.

Official National Mathletics Challenges leading up to World Maths Day
Throughout the year Mathletics host several National Mathletics challenges in the lead up to World Maths Day.  These challenges and the winners list are as follows:

2010 Results
The American Math Challenge :Winner- Alek K, Haddonfields schools, Null.

The Australian Maths Challenge :Winner- Parker C, Home Education, Queensland

The Canadian Math Challenge :Winner- Shekar S, North Kipling Junior Middle School, ON.

The European Schools Maths Challenge:Winner- Anna S, British International School of Ljubljana, Slovenia.

The Middle East Schools Maths Challenge:Winner- Zakria Y, Australian International School, UAE.

The NZ Maths Challenge :Winner- Vlad B, St Mary's School, Christchurch.

The South African Maths Challenge :Winner- Jaden D, Wilton House, GT.

The UK Four Nations Maths Challenge :Winner- Sharan Maiya, Glasgow Academy, Scotland.

2011 Results
The American Math Challenge :Winner- Sayan Das, Team USA, Minnesota.

The Australian Maths Challenge :Winner- Tatiana Devendranath, Team Australia, VIC.

The Canadian Math Challenge :Winner- Tom.L, MPS, Etobicoke.

The European Schools Maths Challenge:Winner-

The Middle East Schools Maths Challenge:Winner- .

The NZ Maths Challenge :Winner- Thomas Graydon, Pitt Island School.

The Pakistan Maths Challenge: Winner- Dilsher A, The International School of Choueifat.

The South African Maths Challenge :Winner- Jaden D, Team ZAF.

The UK Four Nations Maths Challenge :Winner- Sharan Maiya, Glasgow Academy, Scotland, United Kingdom.

2012 Results

The American Math Challenge :Winner- Zhe W, Team USA, Massachusetts

The Latin American Math Challenge :Winner- Adriana Donis, Colegio Internacional Montessori, Guatemala

The Australian Maths Challenge :Winner- Aaron Herrmann,, Seaford 6-12 School, South Australia

The Canadian Math Challenge :Winner- Hanting C, Maywood Community School, Canada

The European Schools Maths Challenge:Winner- Filip Szary, Team Poland

The Middle East Schools Maths Challenge:Winner- Pushp raj P, MES Indian School, Qatar

The NZ Maths Challenge :Winner- Willem Ebbinge, Remarkables Primary School, Otago

The Pakistan Maths Challenge: Winner- Husnain Ali Abid, FFC Grammar H/S School, Punjab

The South African Maths Challenge :Winner- Bradley P, Merrifield College, Eastern Cape

The UK Four Nations Maths Challenge :Winner- Ryan Conlan, Team GBR, Scotland

 2014 results 

The Nigerian Maths Challenge Winner Ayomide Adebanjo''', Xplanter Private School, Lagos

References

External links 
Official website

Mathematics competitions
March observances
Thursday observances
Holidays and observances by scheduling (nth weekday of the month)